The 1995–96 UCLA Bruins men's basketball team represented the University of California, Los Angeles in the 1995–96 NCAA Division I men's basketball season as Defending National Champions from 1995, but bookended the season with two disappointing losses. While ranked #4, one loss was in the Maui Classic to a Santa Clara team led by then obscure guard Steve Nash. The team finished 1st in the conference. The Bruins competed in the 1996 NCAA Division I men's basketball tournament, flopping in a spectacular upset to the unranked Princeton Tigers in the round of 64. This was the final season for head coach Jim Harrick, a national championship coach who was fired over a transgression where he lied about two current players attending a recruiting dinner at Monty's Steakhouse, in contravention of NCAA rules.

Roster

Schedule

|-

|-
!colspan=9 style=| NCAA tournament

Source

References

External links
1995-96 UCLA Bruins Roster and Stats at Sports-Reference.com
1995-96 UCLA Men’s Basketball Roster

Ucla
UCLA Bruins men's basketball seasons
NCAA
NCAA
Ucla